Buxton Road Bridge is a railway bridge over Buxton Road in Whaley Bridge, in the High Peak district, in the county of Derbyshire,  England. It carries the Buxton line.

History 
The bridge was built in 1863. The structure became a Grade II listed building on 19 June 1998.

In 2002, Railtrack became aware of a crack in the in one of the outer iron spans of the bridge. Restrictions on rail traffic passing over the bridge were put in place, including a  speed restriction for freight trains and a ban on two freight trains passing each other on the bridge. In 2010, Network Rail applied for a Listed Building Consent to replace the bridge with a modern structure. The request was turned down the following year and a subsequent appeal was dismissed.

In November 2022, Network Rail applied again for permission to rebuild and modify the bridge.

Work to rebuild the bridge began in January 2023.

References 

Bridges completed in 1863
Railway bridges in Derbyshire
1863 establishments in England
Grade II listed buildings in Derbyshire
Whaley Bridge